Leo Rodriguez may refer to:

 Leo Rodriguez (singer) (born 1991), Brazilian singer and songwriter
 Leo Rodríguez (baseball) (1929–2011), baseball player
 Leonardo Rodríguez (born 1966), Argentine footballer

See also 
 Leonardo Rodríguez (disambiguation)
 Leonor Rodríguez (born 1991), Spanish basketball player